Duiker Island or Duikereiland (Afrikaans), also known as Seal Island (not to be confused with the nearby Seal Island), is an island off Hout Bay near Cape Town South Africa. It is 77 by 95 metres in size, with an area of about 0.4 hectare. 

The island is renowned for its marine wildlife, including the Cape fur seals and marine bird species such as the common cormorants and kelp gulls. It is visited regularly by tourists and photographers by boat via Mariner's Wharf in Hout Bay harbour.

On 13 October 2012, a small vessel carrying tourists to Duiker Island capsized. The incident resulted in the deaths of two men while three women survived by finding air pockets beneath the up-turned vessel.

References

Geography of Cape Town
Uninhabited islands of South Africa
Tourist attractions in Cape Town
Atlantic islands of South Africa